Vexillum (Costellaria) exasperatum, common name : the Roughened Mitre, is a species of small sea snail, marine gastropod mollusk in the family Costellariidae, the ribbed miters.

This species is sometimes spelled as Vexillum exasperata

Description
The shell size varies between 10 mm and 29 mm

Distribution
This species is distributed in the Red Sea, in the Indian Ocean along Chagos Atoll, Madagascar, the Mascarene Basin and Tanzania, and in the Pacific Ocean along the Philippines, Fiji, New Caledonia and the Solomons Islands.

References

 Odhner, N.H.J. (1919). Contribution a la faune malacologique de Madagascar. Arkiv For Zoologi, K. Svenska Vetenskapsakademien 12(6). 52 pp, 4 pl.
 Dautzenberg, Ph. (1929). Mollusqués testaces marins de Madagascar. Faune des Colonies Francaises, Tome III
 Spry, J.F. (1961). The sea shells of Dar es Salaam: Gastropods. Tanganyika Notes and Records 56
 Drivas, J. & M. Jay (1988). Coquillages de La Réunion et de l'île Maurice
 Turner H. 2001. Katalog der Familie Costellariidae Macdonald, 1860. Conchbooks. 1–100 page(s): 16

External links
 
  Liénard, Élizé. Catalogue de la faune malacologique de l'île Maurice et de ses dépendances comprenant les îles Seychelles, le groupe de Chagos composé de Diego-Garcia, Six-îles, Pèros-Banhos, Salomon, etc., l'île Rodrigues, l'île de Cargados ou Saint-Brandon. J. Tremblay, 1877.
  Cernohorsky, Walter Oliver. The Mitridae of Fiji; The veliger vol. 8 (1965)

exasperatum
Gastropods described in 1791